Juan de Araujo  (1646–1712) was a musician and composer of the Early to Mid Baroque.

Araujo was born in Villafranca, Spain.  By 1670 he was nominated maestro di cappella of Lima Cathedral, Peru. In the following years he travelled to Panama and most probably to Guatemala. On his return to  Peru, he was hired as maestro de capilla of Cuzco Cathedral, and in 1680 of Sucre Cathedral (then the Cathedral of La Plata) in Upper Peru (now in Bolivia), where he stayed until his death, and where he trained up to four notable música criolla composers including Blas Tardío de Guzmán.

Works, editions and recordings
Al arma, al arma valientes Jácara a 8 for Saint Ignatius of Loyola.

References

External links

Spanish Baroque composers
1646 births
1712 deaths
Spanish male classical composers
18th-century classical composers
18th-century male musicians
18th-century musicians